Facundo Pellistri Rebollo (born 20 December 2001) is a Uruguayan professional footballer who plays as a winger for Premier League club Manchester United and the Uruguay national team.

Born in Montevideo, Pellistri is a graduate of Peñarol's youth system. He made 37 first-team appearances for the club and was named in the Uruguayan Primera División Team of the Season in 2019. He transferred to Manchester United in October 2020, for a fee of £9 million. Since joining United, he has had two loan spells at Spanish club Alavés, where he made 35 appearances in total.

Pellistri represented Uruguay at under-16 level, before making his senior international debut in January 2022. He played for Uruguay at the 2022 FIFA World Cup.

Early life and education
Pellistri was born in Montevideo to a family of Spanish and Italian origin. He also holds a Spanish passport since his father's grandmother was from A Coruña in Galicia. The lead singer of Uruguayan rock band La Vela Puerca, Sebastián Teysera, is Pellistri's godfather.

Pellistri is the son of an accountant. He was privately educated at two institutions in the Pocitos neighbourhood: St Brendan's School for his early years, where he first learned English, and then Ivy Thomas Memorial School through the fourth grade of high school. His strongest subject at school was Mathematics. In 2019, Pellistri graduated from a pre-architectural study program.

Club career

Peñarol
Pellistri is a youth academy graduate of Peñarol, who he joined in 2012, having previously played youth football for La Picada and River Plate Montevideo. He made his professional debut on 11 August 2019, in Peñarol's 2–2 draw against Defensor Sporting. He scored his first goal on 6 November 2019, in a 3–1 win against Cerro. For his performances in his debut season in the Uruguayan Primera División, he was named in the Equipo Ideal del Campeonato Uruguayo (Ideal Team of the Uruguayan Championship) in December 2019.

Manchester United
Pellistri joined Manchester United on 5 October 2020, for a reported transfer fee of £9 million, on a five-year contract. Diego Forlan, who was then managing Peñarol, endorsed Pellistri in a conversation with Manchester United manager and former teammate Ole Gunnar Solskjær, comparing the young player to Ryan Giggs and emphasising his ability to speak English. His first pre-season goal was on 18 July 2021, against Derby County, in a 2–1 away win at Pride Park. 

On 31 January 2021, Pellistri joined Deportivo Alavés on loan for the remainder of the season. He returned to United to play in their summer pre-season matches, before going back on loan to Alavés in August for the 2021–22 season.

Pellistri made his competitive debut for Manchester United on 10 January 2023, coming on as a substitute and assisting the second goal in a 3–0 EFL Cup win over Charlton Athletic. Pellistri made his Premier League debut on 8 February 2023, coming on as a substitute in a 2–2 draw against Leeds United.

International career
Pellistri is a former Uruguayan youth international, having made two appearances at under-16 level in 2017. He was called up to the senior team for the first time on 7 January 2022, for the World Cup qualifying matches against Paraguay and Venezuela. He made his full international debut on 27 January, in a 1–0 away win against Paraguay.

Pellistri was included in the squad for the 2022 FIFA World Cup. He started and played for 88 minutes in Uruguay's first game of the tournament, against South Korea, before being replaced by Guillermo Varela.

Style of play
A winger, Pellistri has been praised highly for his agility, versatility, dribbling skills, technique, and strategic vision on the field.

Career statistics

Club

International

Honours
Individual
 Uruguayan Primera División Team of the Year: 2019

References

External links

Profile at the Manchester United website
 

2001 births
Living people
Footballers from Montevideo
Association football wingers
Peñarol players
Manchester United F.C. players
Deportivo Alavés players
Uruguayan Primera División players
2022 FIFA World Cup players
Uruguayan footballers
Uruguay international footballers
Uruguayan expatriate footballers
Expatriate footballers in England
Expatriate footballers in Spain
Uruguayan expatriate sportspeople in England
Uruguayan expatriate sportspeople in Spain
Uruguayan people of Spanish descent
Uruguayan people of Italian descent
People educated at Ivy Thomas Memorial School